Dimethoxyethane, also known as glyme, monoglyme, dimethyl glycol, ethylene glycol dimethyl ether, dimethyl cellosolve, and DME, is a colorless, aprotic, and liquid ether that is used as a solvent, especially in batteries. Dimethoxyethane is miscible with water.

Production
Monoglyme is produced industrially by the reaction of dimethylether with ethylene oxide:
CH3OCH3 + CH2CH2O → CH3OCH2CH2OCH3

Applications as solvent and ligand

Together with a high-permittivity solvent (e.g. propylene carbonate), dimethoxyethane is used as the low-viscosity component of the solvent for electrolytes of lithium batteries.  In the laboratory, DME is used as a coordinating solvent.

Dimethoxyethane is often used as a higher-boiling-point alternative to diethyl ether and tetrahydrofuran. Dimethoxyethane acts as a bidentate ligand for some metal cations. It is therefore often used in organometallic chemistry. Grignard reactions and hydride reductions are typical application. It is also suitable for palladium-catalyzed reactions including Suzuki reactions and Stille couplings.  Dimethoxyethane is also a good solvent for oligo- and polysaccharides.

References

External links
 Clariant Glymes Homepage www.glymes.com
 1,2-Dimethoxyethane - chemical product info: properties, production, applications.
 International Chemical Safety Card 1568
 Chemical hazard links

Glycol ethers
Ether solvents
Ligands